Callichthys fabricioi is a tropical freshwater fish belonging to the Callichthyinae sub-family of the family Callichthyidae. The fish will grow in length up to 12.5 centimetres (5 in) SL. C. fabricioi is found in the trans-Andean upper Cauca River in the Magdalena River basin of Colombia. Although described in 1999, two other cogener fish have since been discovered.

References 

Callichthys
Endemic fauna of Colombia
Freshwater fish of Colombia
Fish of the Andes
Magdalena River
Fish described in 1999